The 1899 North Carolina A&M Aggies football team represented the North Carolina A&M Aggies of North Carolina College of Agriculture and Mechanic Arts during the 1899 college football season. In W. C. Riddick's second season at head coach the Aggies compiling a record of 1–2–2, scored 29 points on their opponents and allowing 69.

Schedule

References

North Carolina AandM
NC State Wolfpack football seasons
North Carolina AandM Aggies football